The 2015 Cotswold District Council election took place on 7 May 2015 to elect all members of Cotswold District Council in England. The whole council was up for election. Turnout was substantially up across the district due to the election being held on the same day as the general election and other local elections in England.

Boundary changes had reduced the number of seats from 44 to 34, making exact comparisons with 2011 difficult. The election produced a slightly reduced majority for the ruling Conservative Group but other than a single gain by the Liberal Democrats to produce this result no other ward changed hands.

Results

|}

Ward results

Abbey Ward

Blockley Ward

Bourton Vale Ward

Bourton Village Ward

Campden and Vale Ward

Chedworth and Churn Valley Ward

Chesterton Ward

Coln Valley Ward

Ermin Ward

Fairford North Ward

Fosseridge Ward

Four Acres Ward

Grumbolds Ash with Avening Ward

Kemble Ward

Lechlade, Kempsford and Fairford South Ward

Moreton East Ward

Moreton West Ward

New Mills Ward

Northleach Ward

Sandywell Ward

Siddington and Cerney Rural Ward

South Cerney Village Ward

St Michael's Ward

Stow Ward

Stratton Ward

Tetbury East and Rural Ward

Tetbury Town Ward

Tetbury with Upton Ward

The Ampneys and Hampton Ward

The Beeches Ward

The Rissingtons Ward

Watermoor Ward

By-elections between 2015 and 2019

Stow
A by-election was held on Thursday 29 September 2016 for the Stow ward due to the death of Conservative councillor Barry Dare. The subsequent election was won by the Liberal Democrats.

Fairford North
A by-election was held on Thursday 9 February 2017 for the Fairford North ward due to the resignation of Conservative councillor Abigail Beccle. The subsequent election was won by the Liberal Democrats.

Grumbolds Ash with Avening
A by-election was held on Thursday 23 November 2017 for the Grumbolds Ash with Avening Ward due to the death of Conservative councillor Jim Parsons. The subsequent election was won by the Conservatives.

References

2015 English local elections
May 2015 events in the United Kingdom
2015
2010s in the Cotswolds